John Paul Holota (February 25, 1921 – March 10, 1951) was a Canadian ice hockey player who played 15 games in the National Hockey League with the Detroit Red Wings between 1942 and 1945. The rest of his career, which lasted from 1941 to 1951, was spent in various minor leagues. He won the Stanley Cup with the Red Wings in 1943. He died in a car accident in 1951.

Career statistics

Regular season and playoffs

References

External links
 

1921 births
1951 deaths
Canadian expatriates in the United States
Canadian ice hockey centres
Cleveland Barons (1937–1973) players
Denver Falcons players
Detroit Red Wings players
Ice hockey people from Ontario
Guelph Biltmore Mad Hatters players
Guelph Indians players
New Haven Eagles players
Omaha Knights (AHA) players
Omaha Knights (USHL) players
Ontario Hockey Association Senior A League (1890–1979) players
Portland Eagles players
Road incident deaths in Colorado
Sportspeople from Hamilton, Ontario
Stanley Cup champions